The 1932–33 National Hurling League was the sixth season of the National Hurling League.

Format

The ten participating teams were Clare, Cork, Dublin, Galway, Kilkenny, Laois, Limerick, Offaly, Tipperary and Waterford who were divided into two divisions and agreed to play a four-game format whereby each team would play each of their five rivals once with two points awarded for a win and one point awarded for a drawn game. The two teams with the most points in each division at the completion of the season would play a final to decide the National Hurling League champions.

National Hurling League

Galway came into the season as defending champions of the 1930-31 season.

On 9 April 1933, Kilkenny won the title after a 3-8 to 1-3 win over Limerick in the final. It was their first league title.

Eastern Division table

Group stage results

Western Division table

Group stage results

Play-off

Knock-out stage

Final

References

National Hurling League seasons
League
League